Harry Lennart Yrjö Bergström (1910–1989) was a Finnish pianist, conductor and composer of popular music and film scores.

Selected filmography
 The General's Fiancée (1951)
 A Night in Rio (1951)
 After the Fall of Man (1953)
 It Began in the Rain (1953)
 Song of Warsaw (1953)

References

Bibliography 
 Kääpä, Pietari: Directory of World Cinema: Finland. Intellect Books, 2012.
 Virtamo, Keijo (ed.): Otavan musiikkitieto: A–Ö, pp. 46–47. Helsinki: Otava, 1997. .

External links 
 

1910 births
1989 deaths
Finnish male composers
Musicians from Tampere
20th-century Finnish male musicians